Split Thumb is a  glaciated mountain summit located in the Boundary Ranges of the Coast Mountains, in the U.S. state of Alaska. Split Thumb is surrounded by the Lemon Creek Glacier to the west, and Norris Glacier to east. The Split Thumb Icefall is set on the east aspect of the peak. This peak's descriptive name was published in 1951 by the U.S. Geological Survey. The first ascent of Split Thumb was made July 2, 1954, by a Juneau Icefield Research Project party comprising Edward LaChapelle, Dick Hubley, Carlton Ray, Dr. Conrad Buettner, and Bob Goodwin.

Climate
Based on the Köppen climate classification, Split Thumb is located in a subarctic climate zone, with long, cold, snowy winters, and cool summers. Weather systems coming off the Gulf of Alaska are forced upwards by the Coast Mountains (orographic lift), causing heavy precipitation in the form of rainfall and snowfall. Temperatures can drop below −20 °C with wind chill factors below −30 °C. The month of July offers the most favorable weather to view or climb Split Thumb.

See also

Geospatial summary of the High Peaks/Summits of the Juneau Icefield
Geography of Alaska

References

External links
 Split Thumb weather forecast
 Flickr photo: Split Thumb Icefall
 Photo: "Split Thumb"
 Account of first ascent: Americanalpineclub.org
 Climbing Split Thumb: YouTube
              

Mountains of Alaska
Mountains of Juneau, Alaska
Boundary Ranges
North American 1000 m summits